Mikko Mäenpää (born April 19, 1983) is Finnish professional ice hockey defenceman, currently playing for JYP Jyväskylä in the Liiga.

Playing career
He could not break through into Tappara roster at young age, so he moved to JYP in 2002. He also made brief visits to Pelicans and Mestis teams Jukurit and Sport. After full season in Jukurit in 2005-06 when the team won Mestis title, he moved to HPK and made a breakthrough season in SM-liiga, having 40 points. After the 2006-2007 season, Mäenpää was chosen to the SM-liiga All-Star Team.

He signed a contract with Columbus Blue Jackets of the National Hockey League (NHL) in the summer, but ended up playing for their American Hockey League (AHL) affiliate the Syracuse Crunch. He returned to HPK mid-season, only to continue to Skellefteå AIK in the Swedish Elitserien later in the season. He played two more seasons in HPK until 2010 and had seasons of 47 and 30 points. He was then selected to the national team for the 2010 IIHF World Championship for the first time in his career.

He then returned to Elitserien and signed for Frölunda HC for the 2010–11 season before signing for Amur Khabarovsk of the Kontinental Hockey League in Russia for 2011–12. In 2012–13 he played 25 matches for HC CSKA Moscow and moved to Lev Prague after that. On July 2, 2015, he signed a one-year deal to continue his professional career with HC Ambrì-Piotta, a Swiss team competing in the National League A.

Career statistics

Regular season and playoffs

International

References

External links

1983 births
Living people
HC Ambrì-Piotta players
Amur Khabarovsk players
HC CSKA Moscow players
Finnish ice hockey defencemen
Frölunda HC players
HPK players
JYP Jyväskylä players
HC Lev Praha players
Mikkelin Jukurit players
Lahti Pelicans players
Skellefteå AIK players
Syracuse Crunch players
Vaasan Sport players
Ice hockey people from Tampere
Finnish expatriate ice hockey players in Russia
Finnish expatriate ice hockey players in the United States
Finnish expatriate ice hockey players in the Czech Republic
Finnish expatriate ice hockey players in Sweden
Finnish expatriate ice hockey players in Switzerland